Jesse Huta Galung and Stéphane Robert were the defending champions, but Robert chose not to participate this year. Huta Galung was scheduled to play alongside Pablo Andújar in the qualifying draw, but withdrew with a right calf injury.

Marin Draganja and Henri Kontinen won the title, defeating Jamie Murray and John Peers in the final, 6–3, 6–7(6–8), [11–9].

Seeds

Draw

Draw

Qualifying

Seeds

Qualifiers
  Rameez Junaid /  Adil Shamasdin

Qualifying draw

Barcelona Open Banco Sabadell - Doubles